"" (German for "The Lavender Song") is a German cabaret song written in 1920 with lyrics by  and music by Mischa Spoliansky and is considered one of the first gay anthems.

History
The song is a product of Germany's Weimar Republic, during which time lesbians and gay men enjoyed a short period of improvement in quality of life when the government established basic democratic rights that covered the LGBT community and abolished censorship.

The song was written after the Institut für Sexualwissenschaft (Institute for Sexual Science) under Magnus Hirschfeld made worldwide news with its "First International Conference for Sexual Reform" which called for regulations on sexual behavior to be based on science instead of religion or other unscientific tradition.

The first line of the chorus, "Anders als die Anderen" is the same as the title of a 1919 gay rights film issued by Magnus Hirschfeld. This has been seen as the affirmation of a differentiated queer identity outside the hetereosexual mainstream.

Lyrics

References

External links
 "The Lavender Song" (Das lila Lied), The Weimar Republic – The Fragility of Democracy (facinghistory.org)

1920 songs
German songs
Schlager songs
Political songs
LGBT rights in Germany
LGBT-related songs
First homosexual movement